Vachellia daemon is a species of plant in the family Fabaceae found only in Cuba. It is threatened by habitat loss.

References

daemon
Flora of Cuba
Endangered plants
Taxonomy articles created by Polbot